Algeria (ALG) competed at the 1967 Mediterranean Games in Tunis, Tunisia.

Medal summary

Medal table

References

International Mediterranean Games Committee

Nations at the 1967 Mediterranean Games
1967
Mediterranean Games